Ramsés Rueda Rueda is a Colombian air force general. He serves as Commander of the Colombian Air Force .

References 

Living people
Year of birth missing (living people)
Place of birth missing (living people)
Colombian Air Force